Acidipila is a bacterial genus from the family of Acidobacteriaceae. All reported examples have been isolated from acidic substrates and are capable of growth on sugars

See also 
 List of bacterial orders
 List of bacteria genera

References

Further reading 
 
 

Acidobacteriota
Bacteria genera